Alessandro Gambadori (born 3 January 1981) is an Italian retired professional football player and current head coach of Italian Prima Categoria team Casalguidi 1923 Calcio.

He played 2 games in the Serie A in the 2004/05 season for A.S. Livorno Calcio.

Career

Coaching career
In May 2018 it was confirmed, that 37-year old Gambadori would become the head coach of Italian Prima Categoria team Casalguidi 1923 Calcio from the 2018–19 season, as well as he also would coach the clubs 2006-team.

References

External links
 
 

1981 births
Living people
Italian footballers
Serie A players
Serie B players
Ascoli Calcio 1898 F.C. players
S.S. Chieti Calcio players
L'Aquila Calcio 1927 players
F.C. Pavia players
U.S. Livorno 1915 players
Pisa S.C. players
U.S. Sassuolo Calcio players
U.S. Pistoiese 1921 players
S.S.D. Varese Calcio players
A.C. Monza players
Association football midfielders